Forest City is an unincorporated community in Potter County, in the U.S. state of South Dakota.

History
A post office called Forest City was established in 1884 and remained in operation until 1943. The community was so named for a nearby tract of forest.

References

Unincorporated communities in Potter County, South Dakota
Unincorporated communities in South Dakota